Bandera is a genus of snout moths. It was described by Émile Louis Ragonot in 1887 and is known from the United States.

Species
 Bandera binotella (Zeller, 1872)
 Bandera cupidinella Hulst, 1888
 Bandera virginella Dyar, 1908

References

Phycitinae
Taxa named by Émile Louis Ragonot
Pyralidae genera